Southchurch High School is a coeducational secondary school located in Southend-on-Sea, Essex, England. It opened on 1 September 2016, replacing the former Futures Community College.

Futures Community College was created in 2006 as a trustee school by Southend-on-Sea Borough Council, Prospects College and the UK government to try and lift Thorpe Bay High School out of special measures. A new building was opened in 2010. Prospects moved their Southend campus to share the new building.

As of November 2013 the head teacher was Stuart Reynolds who replaced Stephen Capper who had been appointed for one year to prevent the school being placed in special measures by Ofsted following poor examination results in 2012. However the school returned to special measures in 2014 before coming out in 2016. As part of its rebuilding programme Futures closed its Sixth form in 2015, with PROCAT (the new name for Prospects College) moving out in 2016 to make room for further expansion of the school. In September 2016 the school renamed itself as Southchurch High School and is in the process of becoming part of the Partnership Learning Academy trust.

References

Secondary schools in Southend-on-Sea
Academies in Southend-on-Sea